Françoise de Rimini (Francesca da Rimini) is an opera in four acts with a prologue and an epilogue. The last opera composed by Ambroise Thomas, it sets a French libretto by Michel Carré and Jules Barbier which is based on an episode from Dante's Divine Comedy. The opera was first performed by the Paris Opera on 14 April 1882 but fell into relative obscurity until its revival in 2011.

Background and performance history 
Françoise de Rimini was the last opera by Ambroise Thomas. Its French libretto was written by Michel Carré and Jules Barbier based on Dante's Divina commedia, where Francesca da Rimini is mentioned in the section Inferno.

The opera's world premiere at the Paris Opera was originally planned for 1880. It was to be a highlight of the first season of Auguste Vaucorbeil as director, who also planned to produce Gounod's Le tribut de Zamora. The first performance was finally staged by the Paris Opera on 14 April 1882 at the Palais Garnier. Some of the most notable singers of the time participated in a lavish stage setting by Jean-Baptiste Lavastre to honour the prestigious composer. It received a mixed reception, and despite the efforts of supporters it mostly disappeared from the repertory.

Roles

Synopsis
The action takes place in Hell (prologue and epilogue) and in Rimini at the end of the 13th century.

In the prologue, Dante and Virgil meet the lovers Paolo and Françoise in Hell, and Virgil suggest that Dante tell their story. During the four acts, their passionate love unfolds against the background of the battles between the Guelphs and Ghibellines. In the epilogue, the lovers still sing their passionate duet in the presence of the poets. Finally a heavenly choir pardons them.

Music 
The work is partly still in the style French grand opera, namely the conclusions of the first and third act. The vocal writing shows influence from the Italian opera, while some audacious harmonies and dissonances are part of a more modern style. The duet of the lovers in the fourth act is similar to the duet in Wagner's Tristan und Isolde, in both structure and dramatic function.

References

Further reading
Masson, Georges (2011). "Bicentenaire Ambroise Thomas: Françoise de Rimini, son ultime opéra". Cercle Lyrique de Metz (background essays and complete libretto, in French)
Moreno, H. (16 April 1882). "Françoise de Rimini". Le Ménestrel, pp. 153–157 (detailed review and analysis of the premiere, in French)

External links 
 
 Françoise de Rimini, opéra en quatre actes, avec prologue et épilogue (piano–vocal score), Internet Archive
 Françoise de Rimini at the Bibliothèque nationale de France

Operas by Ambroise Thomas
Operas
1882 operas
Operas set in the 13th century
Operas set in Italy
Operas based on real people
Cultural depictions of Francesca da Rimini
Works based on Inferno (Dante)